Sentinel is a comic book series published by Marvel Comics as part of the Tsunami imprint. It is written by Sean McKeever and illustrated by UDON.

Publication history 

Sentinel was originally launched in 2002 as part of Marvel Comics' Tsunami imprint. The series was cancelled after its 12th issue. However, it returned in November 2005 with the original creative team for a five-issue limited series.

Plot summaries

Vol. 1: Tsunami series 

Sentinel is the story of Juston Seyfert, an ordinary human teenager tormented by the seniors at Antigo High School in Wisconsin. He lives with his younger brother Chris and his father Peter, who operates a junkyard adjacent to their house. Their mother walked out on the family years ago. Being poor, Juston must find his own fun, and spends the days playing in the salvage yard or constructing robots from spare parts.

One day, he finds a micro-processor which he then places into a Battle-Bot that he and his friends use. During the battle however, the robot disappears into the junkyard. Unbeknownst to Juston, the processor was actually the remains of a giant robot programmed to exterminate mutants: a Sentinel.

During this time, Juston also met a senior girl at his school named Jessie Ingram, who he immediately falls for.

A few days after the event, Just discovers the battle bot and the half re-built Sentinel in his junkyard. Initially frightened by the discovery, he begins to assist rebuilding from scrap metal and reprogramming it. The two form something of a bond.

The good news does not last however, as Juston soon discovers the Sentinel's original purpose while searching online and coming across an article featuring the X-Men.  He programs the sentinel to not hurt anybody before installing the final joint. He then creates a harness for himself and goes on an adventure with the sentinel.  Additionally, some bullies that had plagued Juston earlier in the series strike back, hurting one of his friends and turning his crush Jessie against him, with lies that he had told the school body the pair had "hooked-up". Hurt and humiliated after the bullies reveal themselves, Juston returns to the Sentinel, contemplating using it for revenge.

The next day, Jessie tries to find Juston to talk with him, and while talking to his two friends, the Sentinel arrives and begins attacking the school, targeting the two bullies specifically. Before they can be hurt, Juston smashes a hot-wired jeep into the Sentinel, causing it to fall and retreat. It is later revealed that Juston staged the entire attack to earn positive standing at school and in the community, but he begins to feel guilt for the physical and psychological repercussions of his actions. He decides the best course is to use his Sentinel for good.

Juston soon discovers it is not as easy as it looks, as he and his Sentinel are almost caught trying to save the survivors from a plane crash. The CSA, investigating the Sentinel attack on the school, arrive on the scene and begin attacking the Sentinel in an effort to reclaim it. The Sentinel fights back, despite Juston's orders, which puts their relationship in further strain. Unaware that the Sentinel was secretly repairing its prime directive, the robot begins to hunt mutants once again leading to a final confrontation with the head CSA Agent, who was secretly a mutant and deduced that Juston was controlling the sentinel.  Against Juston's orders, the sentinel kills the Agent, so Juston is free of suspicion, but his Sentinel is damaged and confiscated. Juston decides to run away and free the sentinel, then use the sentinel's DNA detection skills to look for his long-lost mother.

Vol. 2: Limited-series 
In the 2005 sequel to the first volume, Juston is still looking for his mother. His friends and family, not knowing where he went, begin to worry and his father does his best to try to find him. Meanwhile, Juston stumbles upon data indicating that his Sentinel was in fact used by a previous owner who used it for murder of a non-mutant. It is revealed that a Wisconsin politician named Senator Jeff Knudsen and a military official named Colonel Archibald Hunt had worked together to take out Senator Knudsen's rival using the sentinel. In Washington D.C., Senator Knudsen and Colonel Hunt discover their Sentinel is out and could incriminate the both of them, leaving them with one option: Destroy it and anybody who knows about it. To do this, they use a new, experimental "stealth" Sentinel Mark VII-A. Juston's search for his mother leads him to an estranged aunt named Ginny Baker, who allows him in only with the hope that she be repaid with money that Juston received from all his media appearances following his "heroics" at the school from the previous volume. When he tells her he does not have any and is only trying to find his mother, Ginny cruelly reveals that she left him and his family because she did not love them. Juston rushes out the door while Ginny calls the local news, leading his father right to her as well. The stealth sentinel catches up to Juston and his sentinel and engages them. It is defeated, but not before doing serious damage.   The sentinel, acting on its directive to protect Juston, takes the opportunity to not only repair itself, but to also build a cockpit for Juston to operate from the inside. Juston makes his way back to Antigo, but is ambushed by the Stealth Sentinel who removes his Sentinel's hand. Juston's Sentinel and the Stealth Sentinel do battle while Juston tries to protect his family and friends in the process.   The stealth sentinel, now manually controlled by Colonel Hunt, is about to land the killing blow, but Senator Knudsen disables the control system--showing mercy for the young boy. Juston destroys the stealth sentinel and swears to Senator Knudsen and Colonel Hunt if the pair comes after him or his Sentinel he will reveal their secret. Juston reunites with his father in a heartfelt reunion where he learns the truth about his mother and then returns to school to meet Jessie and the rest of his friends again. On the final page, it is revealed he still has the Sentinel which now wields one of the Stealth Sentinel's arms and he hopes that he can do some real good now.

Collected Editions

Three Sentinel digests, collecting the entire series, have been released:

References

External links
 Sean Mckeever web site: Store Home > Comicbooks> Sentinel Issues
 Sean Mckeever web site: Store Home > Graphic Novels> Sentinel

2003 comics debuts
Marvel Comics titles
Marvel Comics robots
Characters created by Sean McKeever